Air Marshal Sir Michael George Simmons,  (born 8 May 1937) is a former Royal Air Force officer who became Assistant Chief of the Air Staff.

Flying career
Educated at Shrewsbury School, Simmons was commissioned into the Royal Air Force in 1958. He became Officer Commanding No. 15 Squadron in 1973, Station Commander at RAF Cottesmore in 1980 and Senior Air Staff Officer at Headquarters RAF Strike Command in 1980. He went on to be Air Officer Commanding No. 1 Group in 1985, Assistant Chief of the Air Staff in 1987 and Deputy Controller Aircraft in 1989 before retiring in 1992.

He is President of the Tring Branch of the Royal British Legion.

Family
In 1964 he married Jean Aliwell; they have two daughters.

References

|-

1937 births
Knights Commander of the Order of the Bath
Recipients of the Air Force Cross (United Kingdom)
Royal Air Force air marshals
Living people
People educated at Shrewsbury School